The Institute of Experimental Education in St Petersburg is one of the oldest scientific establishments in Russia. It was founded by Alexander of Oldenburg in 1888 along the lines of Louis Pasteur's Pasteur Institute. It was here that Pavlov did much of his groundbreaking physiological research.

The portal of the library is decorated with tiles created by Peter Vaulin between 1911 and 1913.

Departments
The institute was divided into eight departments:
 Chemistry headed by M.V.Nentsky
 Epizootiology headed by K.Ya.Gelman
 General Bacteriology headed by Sergei Winogradsky
 Pathologic Anatomy headed by N.V.Uskov
 Physiology headed by Pavlov
 Science Library headed by V.G.Ushakov
 Syphilidology headed by E.F.Shperk
 Vaccination Department headed by V.A.Krayushkin

References

External links 
 Official Website

Medical research institutes in Russia
Medical research institutes in the Soviet Union
Cultural heritage monuments of federal significance in Saint Petersburg